The Cape Girardeau–Jackson Metropolitan Statistical Area, as defined by the United States Census Bureau, is an area consisting of two counties in southeastern Missouri and one in southern Illinois, anchored by the cities of Cape Girardeau and Jackson. It was upgraded from a Micropolitan Statistical Area (μSA) to a Metropolitan Statistical Area (MSA) by the Office of Management and Budget on November 20, 2008.

As of the 2010 census, the MSA had a population of 96,275.

Counties
Cape Girardeau County, Missouri
Bollinger County, Missouri
Alexander County, Illinois

Communities

Places with more than 30,000 inhabitants
Cape Girardeau, Missouri (Principal city) Pop: 37,941

Places with 1,000 to 30,000 inhabitants
Jackson, Missouri (Principal city) Pop: 13,758
Scott City, Missouri (partial) Pop: 4,565
Cairo, Illinois Pop: 2,831
Marble Hill, Missouri Pop: 1,477

Places with 250 to 1,000 inhabitants
Tamms, Illinois Pop: 632
Delta, Missouri Pop: 438
Thebes, Illinois Pop: 436
McClure, Illinois Pop: 402
Gordonville, Missouri Pop: 391
East Cape Girardeau, Illinois Pop: 385

Places with fewer than 250 inhabitants
Oak Ridge, Missouri Pop: 243
Sedgewickville, Missouri Pop: 173 
Whitewater, Missouri Pop: 125
Zalma, Missouri Pop: 122
Allenville, Missouri Pop: 116
Pocahontas, Missouri Pop: 114
Dutchtown, Missouri Pop: 94
Glen Allen, Missouri Pop: 85
Old Appleton, Missouri Pop: 85

Unincorporated places
Arab, Missouri
Burfordville, Missouri
Cache, Illinois
Daisy, Missouri
Elco, Illinois
Fayville, Illinois
Friedheim, Missouri
Fruitland, Missouri
Future City, Illinois
Gale, Illinois
Gipsy, Missouri
Grassy, Missouri
Klondike, Illinois
Leopold, Missouri
Miller City, Illinois
Millersville, Missouri
New Wells, Missouri
Olive Branch, Illinois
Patton, Missouri
Sturdivant, Missouri
Urbandale, Illinois

Townships

Cape Girardeau County

Apple Creek 
Byrd 
Cape Girardeau 
Hubble 
Kinder 

Liberty 
Randol 
Shawnee 
Welch 
Whitewater

Bollinger County

Crooked Creek
Fillmore
Liberty
Lorance

Scopus
Union
Wayne
Whitewater

Precincts

Alexander County

Cache No. 1 
Cache No. 2 
Cairo 
Elco 
McClure 
Miller 

Olive Branch 
Sandusky 
Santa Fe 
Tamms 
Thebes 
Unity

Demographics
As of the census of 2000, there were 90,312 people, 35,364 households, and 23,880 families residing within the μSA. The racial makeup of the μSA was 89.79% White, 7.75% African American, 0.40% Native American, 0.64% Asian, 0.02% Pacific Islander, 0.31% from other races, and 1.09% from two or more races. Hispanic or Latino of any race were 0.92% of the population.

The median income for a household in the μSA was $30,987, and the median income for a family was $37,694. Males had a median income of $29,194 versus $19,129 for females. The per capita income for the μSA was $16,106.

Combined Statistical Area
The Cape Girardeau–Sikeston–Jackson Combined Statistical Area is made up of three counties in southeastern Missouri and one county in southern Illinois. The statistical area includes one metropolitan area and micropolitan area. As of the 2000 Census, the CSA had a population of 134,051 (though a July 1, 2009 estimate placed the population at 134,567).

Micropolitan Statistical Areas (μSAs)
Cape Girardeau–Jackson (Cape Girardeau County, Missouri, Bollinger County, Missouri, and Alexander County, Illinois)
Sikeston (Scott County, Missouri)

See also
Missouri census statistical areas

References

 
Metropolitan areas of Missouri
Metropolitan areas of Illinois